is a Japanese baseball player who won a silver medal in the 1996 Summer Olympics.

External links
 
 

1968 births
Living people
Chuo University alumni
Baseball people from Aichi Prefecture
Olympic baseball players of Japan
Olympic silver medalists for Japan
Baseball players at the 1996 Summer Olympics
Olympic medalists in baseball
Asian Games medalists in baseball
Baseball players at the 1994 Asian Games
Asian Games gold medalists for Japan
Medalists at the 1994 Asian Games
Medalists at the 1996 Summer Olympics